Teague Rook is an Australian television and film actor who is best known for his role as Steve Everson in the Australian children's television drama series Silversun.

He has made numerous television appearances in Australian television series including Satisfaction, Blue Heelers, Scooter: Secret Agent, All Saints, Stingers and Neighbours. His film roles include Charlotte's Web.

External links
 

Australian male television actors
Living people
Year of birth missing (living people)